The , also known by its former name, the Nara Research Institute for Cultural Properties, is one of two research institutes that comprise the National Institutes for Cultural Heritage, an independent administrative institution created in 2001. Established in April 1952 as part of the National Commission for Protection of Cultural Properties, the institute is located in the city of Nara, in Nara Prefecture, Japan, with branches elsewhere in Nara Prefecture. The institute is divided into departments for the excavation and restoration of the Asuka Palace, the Fujiwara Palace, and the Heijō Palace, historical remains, gardens, and other archaeological sites, and for the study of documents from Japan's early history. The Asuka Historical Museum is also managed by the institute.

History

Timeline
 1952 - The Institute was established under the National Commission for Protection of Cultural Properties
 1968 - The institute moved to the Agency for Cultural Affairs, Japanese Ministry of Education
 2001 - Independent Administrative Institution National Research Institute for Cultural Properties is created by merger of the Tokyo Research Institute for Cultural Properties, and the National Research Institute for Cultural Properties, Nara.
 2007 - Independent Administrative Institution National Institutes for Cultural Heritage is established by merging two Independent Administrative Institutions -- the Independent Administrative Institution National Research Institute for Cultural Properties, which had been created in 2001; plus the Independent Administrative Institution National Museum (the IAI National Museum), also created in 2001. The IAI National Museum had been created by merging the Tokyo National Museum, the Kyoto National Museum, the Nara National Museum in 2001; and the Kyushu National Museum had been incorporated into the organization in 2005.

Organizational structure

Department of Planning and Coordination
Planning and Coordination Section
Data and Information Cooperation Section
International Cooperation Section
Exhibition Section
Photography Section
Department of Cultural Heritage
Historical Document Section
Architectural History Section
Cultural Landscape Section
Site Stabilization Section
Department of Imperial Palace Sites Investigations
Archaeology Section 1
Archaeology Section 2
Archaeology Section 3
History Section
Architectural Feature Section
Center for Archaeological Operations
Conservation Science Section
Environmental Archaeology Section
Dating Section
Archaeological Research Methodology Section
Asuka Historical Museum (Asuka, Nara Prefecture)
Curatorial Section
Affairs Section

Transportation

The Nara National Research Institute for Cultural Properties is located in close proximity to the Yamato-Saidaiji Station on the Kintetsu Nara Line, Kyoto Line, and Kashihara Line.

Footnote

A.The home page of the Institute dates its establishment to April 1952; other sources list 1972.

References

External links
 Nara National Research Institute for Cultural Properties
 Cultural Properties for Future Generations
 Preservation and Utilization of Cultural Properties

Research institutes in Japan
Japanese studies
Kansai Science City